Risk 2210 A.D. is a 2–5 player board game by Avalon Hill that is a futuristic variant of the classic board game Risk. Risk 2210 A.D. was designed by Rob Daviau and Craig Van Ness and first released in 2001. In 2002, it won the Origins Award for "Best Science Fiction or Fantasy Board Game of 2001".

Equipment
The boxed set includes:
 1 Earth Game Board, including land territories and water colonies.
 1 Moon Game Board
 5 different colored sets of playing pieces:
 MODs (Machines of Destruction) in denomination sizes of 1, 3, and 5.
 4 Space Stations
 The 5 commanders
 Energy in denominations of 1s and 5s
 5 command card decks (1 for each type of commander)
 3 territory card decks, 1 for each type of territory (land, water, moon)
 5 Turn Order Markers
 4 Devastation Markers
 1 Score Chart
 6 and 8 sided dice, three of each black (attack dice), and two of each white (defense dice), 10 total dice

Box redesign
2210 A.D. originally came packaged in a rectangular boxed set with a playing board that folded into fourths. At some point the design changed to a square, like the packaging for Risk Godstorm. The board in the square box folds into sixths, the cardboard playing pieces are one-sided as opposed to being printed on both sides as they were for the rectangular box, and the Moon was printed on much thinner cardstock.

Gameplay

Setup
Before the game, 4 cards are randomly selected from the land territory deck. Each of the 4 territory cards drawn will have a "devastation marker" placed on its corresponding territory on the earth game board. These territories are impassable for the rest of the game.

Each player is allocated 3 energy chips before the game begins. The number of armies allocated to each player and the process of claiming territories is identical to the Standard Risk board game, but the armies are called MODs; therefore, number of MODs allocated to each player at the beginning of the game depends on the number of players.  If three people are playing, each player counts out 35 MODs; four players, 30 MODs; five players, 25 MODs. Players then take turns claiming land territories by placing a 1.0 MOD on an unoccupied land territory until all the land territories are occupied. Players then take turns placing their remaining armies on their claimed land territories. Following MOD placement, each player places a space station, a land commander, and a diplomat on any of their claimed territories.

Water and Lunar territories may not be claimed at the beginning of the game. Devastated land territories can not be claimed or occupied at any point during the game.

Determining turn order
The game is limited to five rounds called years. At the beginning of each year, players use energy chips they have accumulated to bid for turn order through a first-price sealed-bid auction format. Players secretly bid energy by placing the corresponding energy chips they would bid into a closed hand. Players open their hands containing their bids simultaneously. The highest bidder selects which turn order they want, then the next highest bidder, and so on. The highest bidder may select any turn the player wants; the player is not limited to "first."

Ending game
After each player has completed their turn, a year is considered to have passed. At the end of year 5, each player's score is calculated based on the number of territories the player owns, colonies the player holds, and the number of colony influence cards the player has the commanders to activate. The player with the highest score wins.

Player turn

Turn order overview
At the beginning of each player's turn, based on the number of countries the player owns and whole continents the player holds, the player gains additional MODs and energy. The player places the MODs and then has the opportunity to buy additional commanders, cards, and space stations. Then the player may play command cards that they have sufficient energy to activate. Next comes the attack phase in which, if the player successfully takes three contested territories, the player receives one bonus energy and one bonus command card. After the attack phase, the player may move one group of units from any one of the player's territories to any other territory the player occupies, so long as both territories are connected by a path of their own territories.

Collection of energy and deployment of MODs
Similar to the obtaining reinforcements in classic Risk, players receive additional MODs and Energy at the beginning of their turn.  The number of MODs received is a function of the number of territories a player owns, a player's colony bonuses, and the number of space stations a player controls. Players divide their total number of territories, regardless of type, by three and receive that number of MODs rounded down to the nearest integer. If this result is less than three, round up to three MODs. The Score Chart is designed to aide players in this task. Additionally, players receive colony bonuses by occupying all the territories in a land, water, or lunar colony at the beginning of their turn. This is similar to continental bonuses in classic Risk. These MODs are dispersed among the player's controlled territories as they choose. Players also place one MOD on each of territory that contain a Space Station they control.

Players receive Energy equal to the number of MODs received at this point in the turn.

Commanders and space stations
After players have collected energy and deployed their MODs, players may purchase commanders and space stations. Commanders cost three energy while space stations cost five energy.

One of the biggest differences from classic Risk is the addition of commanders: land, naval, space, nuclear, and diplomat. These fill a number of roles. Their most basic function is to act as an improved army unit, enabling players to roll eight-sided dice rather than the typical six-sided ones. This is explained more thoroughly in the next section. Space and naval commanders allow movement into Moon or Water territories respectively.

Command cards
Perhaps one of the most important functions of the commanders is allowing the purchase and use of commander cards. After players have purchased and placed their commanders or space station, players may purchase a maximum of four commander cards at a cost of one energy per card. Players may only purchase commander cards if they have the corresponding commander in play. The text of the commander card will illustrate when the card may, or must, be played. Many of the Commander cards have energy costs that must be paid if the card is to be put into play.

Each commander deck adds its own strategic elements to the game. Diplomat cards tend to be low cost cards that increase unit mobility or place a negative effect on other players. Land Cards tend to be low cost cards that increase the number of MODs available to a player. Naval cards tends to have the emphasize energy gain. The nuclear deck contains relatively higher cost cards with sweeping global effects. Space Cards tend to be a mixture of the elements already described.
If an Armageddon card is played, then even if your nuclear commander is destroyed mid turn you can finish playing the nuclear card.

Invading territories
Three major elements differentiate invasion in Risk 2210 A.D. from classic Risk: limitations in which territories may be invaded, how commanders affect dice, and how space stations affect dice. Players may only invade Water or Lunar territories if they have the corresponding commander in play. Additionally Lunar territories can only be invaded from the Earth game board by a territory containing a space station. Only three of the territories on the Moon game board can be invaded into from the Earth game board. These are the Sea of Crisis, Tycho, and Bay of Dew. Players can not invade from the moon to earth without the "Invading Earth" card found in the Space Deck.

If no commanders are attacking or defending a territory, play continues identically to classical Risk. However, defending players may defend their territories using an 8-sided die instead of a 6-sided die if a commander is present in that territory. If two commanders are present in a defending territory, the defender may substitute both of the 6-sided dice used in defense for two 8-sided dice. This is true regardless of commander type for defending.

Substitution of 6-sided dice with 8-sided dice for invading players is contingent on the type of territory that player is invading into/from and the type of commander that player is invading into. The following table is provided in the Risk 2210 A.D. Gameplay Manual.

Players do not have to remove commanders if they suffer a loss while using an 8-sided die. Players may remove MODs from their corresponding invading or defending territories first. Commanders are removed from a defending player if an invading player destroys all MODs in an defending player's territory. Commanders may be repurchased.

All units in space stations, regardless of type, defend with 8-sided dice. If a territory with a space station is captured by an invading player, that space station is replaced with another of the invading player's same color.

Similar to classic Risk, if an invading player captured three or more contested territories, territories defended by another player, the invading player receives one energy and one commander card. Commander cards received this way can only be chosen from Commanders that the invading player currently has in play.

Fortifying
A player may end their turn by fortifying. To fortify, players move as many units as they desire from one territory, and only one territory, to another territory that is connected at all points by territories that player occupies. Players need not own a space or naval commander to fortify into lunar or water territories. However, to fortify from a territory on the Earth game board to a territory on the Moon game board, one of the connected territories must be a space station.

Prominent differences from classic Risk
 Only five players (classic Risk seats six)
 Addition of water and moon territories
 Addition of commanders (land, naval, space, nuclear, diplomat)
 Command card decks corresponding to each of the five commanders
 Players earn and spend "energy" to obtain commanders, cards, and space stations and to activate some command cards
 Players can roll an 8-sided die in some instances
 Armies are not acquired through card trading
 The game is only 5 years (turns) long; the winner is the player with highest score at the end of the last year
 Players bid energy to determine turn order rather than following the same order determined by a dice from the beginning of the game.

Territories
Geographically, the map is nearly identical to the classic Risk map. It has the same forty-two territories as before, but they have somewhat different names; Greenland, for example, is now the Exiled States of America. There is a tendency for large territories to be given the name of a present-day microstate (Andorra, Djibouti, Hong Kong, and Lesotho). Additionally, a few connections are removed from the Earth board that are present in classic Risk board; the picture shows that Egypt is the only African country to have a connection with Middle East.

Thirteen water territories divided into five colonies and fourteen lunar territories divided into three colonies have been added. Similar to continental bonuses, if a player controls all the territories in a lunar or water colony at the beginning of their turn, they will receive additional MODs and energy that turn.

The map changes each game: Before any units are placed, four Devastation markers are positioned randomly on the board. Those four territories are nuclear wastelands that are impassable and uninhabitable during the game.

Commanders and cards

One of the biggest differences from classic Risk is the addition of commanders: land, naval, space, nuclear, and diplomat. These fill a number of roles. Card play can shift the balance of power rapidly. Players can only buy four cards at a time, and only for commanders in play. Like the new avenues of movement, cards open up the board by making no position impregnable, no attack a certainty. With cards in use, the game is more fluid and positions are constantly shifting. There is a separate deck of cards for each type of commander. Perhaps the most devastating card attacks are enabled by the nuclear commander: Playing a nuclear card has the potential to destroy all the armies on an entire continent.

Energy
Energy also has a strategic importance. It is used to buy cards, to bring commanders and space stations into play, to bid for the most advantageous place in the turn order, and to play certain cards. Each round, players bid energy for the right to choose when they want to take their turns. But players who spend too much energy one turn may find themselves playing at a disadvantage the next turn, or even for the rest of the game.

Turn limit
Risk 2210 A.D. includes a five-turn limit, although it is possible to play as in normal Risk with unlimited turns.  Whoever controls the most territories (and bonuses) at the end of the fifth year wins.

The game includes the necessary equipment and cards for playing the classic version of Risk.

Renamed territories
A map of the original Risk board, which does not contain the US Pacific regions, and has different oceanic connections. In more recent game boards, the connection between East Africa and the Middle East has been removed. There is also a moon map board used in Risk 2210 A.D. Note: there does not appear to be a bridge between the Exiled States of America and Canada on the actual artwork. Lunar territories (not pictured) are noted by an asterisk.

North America
 Aleutian Empire "Northwestern Oil Emirate"
 Alberta
 Mexitlopoctli "Mexico"
 American Republic
 Exiled States of America
 Nunavut
 Canada
 République du Québec
 Continental Biospheres
South America
 Argentina
 Amazon Desert
 Andean Nations
 Nuevo Timoto

Europe
 New Avalon
 Iceland GRC (Genetic Research Center)
 Warsaw Republic
 Jotenheim
 Imperial Balkania
 Ukrayina
 Andorra

Africa
 Zaire Military Zone
 Ministry of Djibouti
 Egypt
 Madagascar
 Saharan Empire
 Lesotho

Antarctica
 Free Afrikaans Republic
 Shackleton
 Independent Kansas
 Southern Anarchist Control Zone

Asia
 Afghanistan
 Hong Kong
 United Indiastan
 Alden
 Japan
 Pevek
 Middle East
 Khan Industrial State
 Angkhor Wat
 Siberia
 Enclave of the Bear
 Sakha

Australia
 Australian Testing Ground
 Java Cartel
 New Guinea
 Aboriginal League

US Pacific
 Poseidon
 Hawaiian Preserve
 New Atlantis
Asia Pacific
 Sung Tzu
 Neo Tokyo
Southern Atlantic
 The Ivory Reef
 Neo Paulo
Northern Atlantic
 Nova Brasilia
 New York City
 Western Ireland
Indian
 South Ceylon
 Microcorp
 Akara

Cresinion
 Harpalus*
 Sea of Rains*
 Ocean of Storms*
 Bay of Dew*
Delphot
 Aristotle*
 Sea of Serenity*
 Sea of Crisis*
 Sea of Nectar*
Sajon
 Rhaeticus*
 Byrgius (crater)*
 Sea of Clouds*
 Straight Wall*
 Marsh of Diseases*
 Tycho*

Expansions
Avalon Hill has released a number of expansions for the 2210 A.D. game. Used as Tournament awards, these expansions were originally available only to retailers and have not been released commercially. To date, there are four "official" expansions, under the name "Frontline". A number of unofficial expansions have also been created by fans, covering such themes as terrorism, aerial assault, zombies, Antarctica and Godstorm-style relics

Video game version
A video game version of Risk 2210 A.D. called Invade Earth was created by Jonathan Crosmer using Java. It also allowed users to play the original Risk, Risk: Godstorm and a few other variations of the game. Players could also network across the Internet to play with others. Invade Earth ceased to function in February 2018 due to security updates to Java.

See also
 List of licensed Risk game boards
 Risk
 Risk Godstorm, a mythical-setting variant of Risk that followed Risk 2210 A.D.

References

External links
 Risk 2210 A.D. on Wizards of the Coast's website
 
 Belgium2210.be: Belgian Risk 2210 A.D. fan and resource site
 risk2210.net: Risk 2210 A.D. fan made expansion resources

Avalon Hill games
Board games introduced in 2001
Origins Award winners
Risk (game)
Science fiction board games